Bogner Amplification is an American guitar amplifier manufacturing company founded by Reinhold Bogner in 1989 in Los Angeles, California. Bogner began by custom-building boutique amplifiers based on classic (blackface) Fenders, and now offers different models of serially produced amplifiers.

History
German amp builder Reinhold Bogner moved to California hoping to gain entrance into the burgeoning market for high-gain guitar amplifiers, where Mesa Boogie was the market leader and companies like Soldano and Rivera Amplifiers were following in Mesa's footsteps.

The first amplifiers he made were often based on 1960s Fender Showmans, even using the original faceplate and chassis. They were handwired "one-off custom amps", which he sold to players such as Eddie Van Halen, Steve Stevens, and Allan Holdsworth.

Models

Initially, Bogner made two custom models; earlier (three-channel) models were designated Ecstasy 100A and 100B and later models 101A and 101B—the "A" meaning "American", with 6L6 tubes, and the "B" referencing "British", with EL34 tubes, the latter being "very close to the Fender-meets-hotrodded-Marshall template Bogner was aiming at in the first place."

The Caveman amplifier was built not long after the Ecstasy and featured two channels completely hand-wired. The production run was 60 units.
, Bogner makes three lines of amplifiers, all with switchable channels and "truly fearsome amounts of gain."

 Überschall (according to Bogner, "Armageddon in a box")
 Ecstasy (the "flagship" model)
 Shiva (with two channels)

References

External links
 

Guitar amplifier manufacturers
Manufacturing companies based in Los Angeles
Audio equipment manufacturers of the United States